The 2016 FIBA 3x3 Under-18 World Championship was an international 3x3 basketball event hosted in Kazakhstan. It featured separate competitions for men's and women's under-18 national teams. The tournament was held in Astana in front of the Astana Opera. It was co-organized by the FIBA.

Participating teams
The FIBA 3x3 Federation Ranking was used as basis to determine the participating FIBA member associations. The winners of both the men's and women's tournaments of the 2014 edition, New Zealand and France respectively automatically qualifies.

Men

Women

References

  
2016
2016 in 3x3 basketball
2015–16 in Kazakhstani basketball
International basketball competitions hosted by Kazakhstan
Sport in Astana